Semyon Kulikov (born 8 July 1891, date of death unknown) was a Russian Empire gymnast. He competed in the men's artistic individual all-around event at the 1912 Summer Olympics.

References

1891 births
Year of death missing
Male artistic gymnasts from the Russian Empire
Olympic gymnasts of Russia
Gymnasts at the 1912 Summer Olympics
Gymnasts from Saint Petersburg